The 2019 Salford City Council election to elect members of Salford City Council in England took place on 2 May 2019.  This was on the same day as other local elections.

Results

Declared candidates. Asterisk denotes the sitting councillor.

Barton

Boothstown and Ellenbrook

Broughton

Cadishead

Claremont

Eccles

Irlam

Irwell Riverside

Kersal

Langworthy

Little Hulton

Ordsall

Pendlebury

Swinton North

Swinton South

Walkden North

Walkden South
This election took place on 20 June 2019 as the original Conservative candidate George Darlington died following a stroke on 26 April 2019.

Weaste and Seedley

Winton

Worsley

References

2019 English local elections
2019
2010s in Greater Manchester
May 2019 events in the United Kingdom